Yamautidius is a genus of beetles in the family Carabidae, containing the following species:

 Yamautidius aenigmaticus Ueno, 1978
 Yamautidius anaulax Ueno, 1978
 Yamautidius basisquamatus Ueno, 1982
 Yamautidius compositus Ueno, 1982
 Yamautidius croson Ueno & Naito, 2006
 Yamautidius debilis Ueno, 1982
 Yamautidius dilaticollis Ueno, 1982
 Yamautidius edentatus Ueno, 1982
 Yamautidius emarginatus Ueno, 1982
 Yamautidius eos Ueno, 1982
 Yamautidius fissuralis Ueno, 1990
 Yamautidius flabellatus Ueno, 1982
 Yamautidius hirakei Ueno, 1982
 Yamautidius ishikawaorum Ueno, 1982
 Yamautidius latipennis Ueno, 1960
 Yamautidius mohrii Ueno, 1982
 Yamautidius pubicollis Ueno, 1957
 Yamautidius rarissimus Ueno, 1982
 Yamautidius ryosukei Ueno, 1960
 Yamautidius securiger Ueno, 1982
 Yamautidius spinulosus Ueno, 1982
 Yamautidius squamosus Ueno, 1982
 Yamautidius sucmo Ueno & Naito, 2006
 Yamautidius tetsuoi Ueno, 1982
 Yamautidius uozumii Ueno, 1982
 Yamautidius yamauchii Ueno, 1982

References

Trechinae